The 1972 season in Swedish football, starting April 1972 and ending November 1972:

Honours

Official titles

Notes

References 
Online

 
Seasons in Swedish football